The 1999 Sports Racing World Cup was the third season of Sports Racing World Cup (later known as the FIA Sportscar Championship).  It was a series for sportscar style prototypes broken into two classes based on power and weight, called SR1 and SR2.  It began on March 28, 1999, and ended November 28, 1999, after 9 races.

Schedule

Season results

Teams Championship
Points are awarded to the top 10 finishers in the order of 20-15-12-10-8-6-4-3-2-1.  Only the highest placing car within a team earned points towards the championship.  The SportsRacing World Cup was available to all teams that participated, but a separate SR2 only championship was also held.

Overall standings

SR2 standings

External links
 1999 Sports Racing World Cup results

Sports Racing World Cup
FIA Sportscar Championship